Subniso is a genus of very small ectoparasitic sea snails, marine gastropod mollusks or micromollusks in   the Eulimidae family.

Species
Species within the genus Subniso :
 Subniso hipolitensis (Bartsch, 1917)
 Subniso osorioae Raines, 2003
 Subniso rangi (de Folin, 1867)

References

 McLean J. H. (2000). Four new genera for northeastern Pacific gastropods. The Nautilus. 114: 99-102.

Eulimidae